Islam is the state religion of Saudi Arabia. The government of Saudi Arabia has been criticized for its restrictions on religious freedom. Law requires citizens to be Muslim, and, public worship by adherents of religions other than Islam is forbidden. Any non-Muslim foreigner attempting to acquire Saudi Arabian nationality must convert to Islam. Furthermore, Hanbali is the official version of Sunni Islam and adherence to other sects is restricted. According to a 2012 online poll by WIN-Gallup International, 5% of 502 Saudi Arabians surveyed stated they were "convinced atheists".

Freedom of religion

Saudi Arabia is an Islamic theocracy. Religious minorities do not have the right to practice their religion openly. Conversion from Islam to another religion is punishable by death as apostasy. Proselytizing by non-Muslims, including the distribution of non-Muslim religious materials such as Bibles, Bhagavad Gita, Torah and Ahmedi Books are illegal. In late 2014, a law was promulgated calling for the death penalty for anyone bringing into the country "publications that have a prejudice to any other religious beliefs other than Islam" (thought to include non-Muslim religious books).

The annual report of the United States Commission on International Religious Freedom (USCIRF) tagged Saudi Arabia along with 15 other nations as “countries of particular concern” for engaging in or tolerating “systematic, ongoing, egregious violations [of religious freedom]”.

Religious groups

Islam

The official form of Islam is Sunni of the Hanbali school, in its Salafi version. According to official statistics 85-90% of Saudi Arabian citizens are Sunni Muslims, 10-12% are Shia. More than 30% of the population is made up of foreign workers  who are predominantly but not entirely Muslim. The two holiest cities of Islam, Mecca and Medina, are in Saudi Arabia. For many reasons, non-Muslims are not permitted to enter the holy cities, although some Western non-Muslims have been able to enter, disguised as Muslims.

Non-Muslims
Out of the kingdom's total population of about 35 million, there are about 9 million foreign workers, many of whom are non-Muslim.

For non-Sunni Muslims, non-Muslims, and non-religious, "freedom of religion is neither recognized nor protected under the law" and Saudi "government policies continued to place severe restrictions on religious freedom", according to the 2013 International Religious Freedom Report of the U.S. State Department.

According to Human Rights Watch, the Shia Muslim minority face systematic discrimination from the Saudi Arabian government in education, the justice system and especially religious freedom. Shias also face discrimination in employment and restrictions are imposed on the public celebration of Shia festivals such as Ashura and on the Shia taking part in communal public worship.

As no faith other than Islam is permitted to be practiced openly; no churches, temples, or other non-Muslim houses of worship are permitted in the country although there are nearly a million Christians as well as Hindus and Buddhists—nearly all foreign workers—in Saudi Arabia. Private prayer services are suppressed, and the Saudi Arabian religious police reportedly regularly search the homes of Christians. Foreign workers are not allowed to celebrate Christmas or Easter. In 2007, Human Rights Watch requested that King Abdullah stop a campaign to round up and deport foreign followers of the Ahmadiyya faith.

Proselytizing by non-Muslims is illegal, and conversion by Muslims to another religion (apostasy) carries the death penalty (though there have been no confirmed reports of executions for apostasy in recent years). Religious inequality extends to compensation awards in court cases. Once fault is determined, a Muslim receives the full amount of compensation determined, a Jew or Christian half, and all others a sixteenth. Saudi Arabia has officially identified atheists as terrorists. Saudi Arabians or foreign residents who call "into question the fundamentals of the Islamic religion on which this country is based" may be subject to as much as 20 years in prison.

Policy of exclusion
According to scholar Bernard Lewis, the Saudi Arabian policy of excluding non-Muslims from permanent residence in the Arabian peninsula is a continuation of an old and widely accepted Muslim policy:
 The classical Arabic historians tell us that in the year 20 after the hijra (Muhammad's move from Mecca to Medina), corresponding to 641 of the Christian calendar, the Caliph Umar decreed that Jews and Christians should be removed from Arabia to fulfill an injunction Muhammad uttered on his deathbed: "Let there not be two religions in Arabia." The people in question were the Jews of the oasis of Khaybar in the north and the Christians of Najran in the south.

[The hadith] was generally accepted as authentic, and Umar put it into effect. Compared with European expulsions, Umar's decree was both limited and compassionate. It did not include southern and southeastern Arabia, which were not seen as part of Islam's holy land. ... the Jews and Christians of Arabia were resettled on lands assigned to them – the Jews in Syria, the Christians in Iraq. The process was also gradual rather than sudden, and there are reports of Jews and Christians remaining in Khaybar and Najran for some time after Umar's edict.

But the decree was final and irreversible, and from then until now the holy land of the Hijaz has been forbidden territory for non-Muslims. According to the Hanbali school of Islamic jurisprudence, accepted by both the Saudi Arabians and the declaration's signatories, for a non-Muslim even to set foot on the sacred soil is a major offense. In the rest of the kingdom, non-Muslims, while admitted as temporary visitors, were not permitted to establish residence or practice their religion.

While Saudi Arabia does allow non-Muslims to live in Saudi Arabia to work, they may not practice religion publicly. According to the government of the United Kingdom:
The public practice of any form of religion other than Islam is illegal; as is an intention to convert others. However, the Saudi Arabian authorities accept the private practice of religions other than Islam, and you can bring a Bible into the country as long as it is for your personal use. Importing larger quantities than this can carry severe penalties.

Christianity

Estimates of the number of Christians in Saudi Arabia range from 1,500,000 to 1,800,000. All Christians in the Kingdom are foreign workers.   Christians have complained of religious persecution by authorities. In one case in December 2012, 35 Ethiopian Christians working in Jeddah (six men and 29 women who held a weekly evangelical prayer meeting) were arrested and detained by the kingdom’s religious police for holding a private prayer gathering. While the official charge was “mixing with the opposite sex” — a crime for unrelated people in Saudi Arabia — the offenders complained they were arrested for praying as Christians.   A 2006 report in Asia News states that there are "at least one million" Roman Catholics in the kingdom. It states that they are being  "denied pastoral care ... Catechism for their children – nearly 100,000 – is banned."  It reports the arrest of a Catholic priest for saying mass in 2006.  "Fr. George [Joshua] had just celebrated mass in a private house when seven religious policemen (muttawa) broke into the house together with two ordinary policemen. The police arrested the priest and another person."

According to the Middle East editor of The Economist magazine, Nicolas Pelham, the kingdom contains "perhaps the largest and fastest-growing Christian community in the Middle East" and strict religious laws -- such as banning Christians from Mecca and Medina -- are not always enforced:
Though Christians are forbidden from worshiping publicly, congregations at weekly prayer meetings on foreign compounds can be several hundred strong.

In 2018, it was reported that the religious police had stopped enforcing the ban on Christians religious services anywhere in the Kingdom whether publicly or privately, and for the first time, a "documented Christian service" was openly conducted. Sometime before 1 December 2018, a Coptic Mass was performed in the city of Riyadh by Ava Morkos, Coptic Bishop of Shobra Al-Kheima in Egypt, during his visit to Saudi Arabia (according to Egyptian and other Arab media).
Ava Morkos was originally invited to Saudi Arabia by Crown Prince Mohammad bin Salman in March 2018.

Hinduism

As of 2001, there were an estimated 1,500,000 Indian nationals in Saudi Arabia, most of them Muslims, but some Hindus. Like other non-Muslim religions, Hindus are not permitted to worship publicly in Saudi Arabia. There have also been some complaints of destruction of Hindu religious items by Saudi Arabian authorities.

Irreligion

Disbelief in God is a capital offense in the kingdom. Traditionally, influential conservative clerics have used the label ‘atheist’ to apply not to those who profess to believe that God does not exist, but to "those who question their strict interpretations of Islamic scriptures or express doubts about the dominant version of Islam known as Wahhabism". Examples of those so condemned (but not executed) include:
Hamza Kashgari, who was jailed for 20 months after tweeting some unconventional thoughts about Muhammad, "none of which indicated he did not believe in God".
Raif Badawi (editor of the Free Saudi Liberals website), who was sentenced to 1000 lashes, ten years in prison and fined 1 million riyal (equal to about $267,000) in 2014 after he was convicted of insulting Islam on his website and on television.  The original 2013 sentence was seven years and 600 lashes, but was changed on appeal.

In February / March 2014, a series of new anti-terrorism laws were decreed. Article 1 of the law also conflated atheism and religious dissent, outlawing "calling for atheist thought in any form, or calling into question the fundamentals of the Islamic religion on which this country is based".

According to "anecdotal, but persistent" evidence, since sometime around 2010, the number of atheists in the kingdom has been growing. News agencies such as Alhurra, Saurress and the American performance-management consulting company Gallup

A commission set up by the Committee for the Promotion of Virtue and the Prevention of Vice In its report, the commission said that it got over 9,341 complaints about pornographic sites in one year. It also received over 2,734 reports about sites that promoted atheism and misleading information about religion.  A government official announced in that same year that 850 websites and social media pages espousing views deemed to be "atheistic" in nature have been blocked in the country over a span of 16 months.

See also
 International propagation of Salafism and Wahhabism
 List of mosques in Saudi Arabia

References

 
Human rights in Saudi Arabia